Rafał Kosznik (born 17 December 1983) is a Polish professional footballer who plays as a left-back for Radunia Stężyca.

External links
 
 

1983 births
Living people
Polish footballers
Poland international footballers
Lechia Gdańsk players
AC Omonia players
Warta Poznań players
GKS Bełchatów players
Górnik Zabrze players
Górnik Łęczna players
Ekstraklasa players
I liga players
II liga players
III liga players
Cypriot First Division players
Polish expatriate footballers
Expatriate footballers in Cyprus
People from Kościerzyna
Sportspeople from Pomeranian Voivodeship
Association football defenders